André Migot (1892–1967) was a French doctor, traveler and writer.

He served as an army medical officer in World War I, winning the Croix de Guerre. After the war he engaged in research in marine biology, and then practised as a doctor in France; in his spare time, he climbed in the Alps and Pyrenees. In 1938 he set off to India by bicycle to pursue his interest in Oriental religions. During World War II he worked as a doctor in occupied Paris.

After the war he went to Indochina, whence in 1947 he made a journey alone through Eastern Tibet and China in order to research aspects of Tibetan Buddhism. During this journey he tried but failed to reach Lhasa disguised as a mendicant lama. As he could speak and write Tibetan, he was able to converse with the lamas, and was initiated into the Karma Kagyu lineage at Shangu Gompa, a lamasery outside modern-day Yushu. This journey is described in his best-known book Caravane vers Bouddha, translated into English by Peter Fleming as Tibetan Marches.

From Beijing, where that book ends in 1948, he made an equally adventurous journey back through Tibet to Indochina. Later he spent two years in the Kerguelen Islands as a doctor to a French expedition. In 1954 he joined an Australian expedition in the same region.

He wrote many other books on his travels, and on Oriental religion and philosophy.

References
Migot, André (translated by Peter Fleming) (1955). Tibetan Marches, Rupert Hart-Davis, London

1892 births
1967 deaths
French explorers
French travel writers
Tibet
French male non-fiction writers
20th-century French male writers